The Red Sea cliff swallow (Petrochelidon perdita), also known as the Red Sea swallow, is a species of bird in the family Hirundinidae.

Distribution and habitat
It is possibly endemic to Sudan. It is known only from a single specimen, found in May 1984 at the Sanganeb lighthouse, north-east of Port Sudan, Sudan.  This enigmatic swallow may still exist, though the lack of recent records is puzzling. Unidentified swallows have been sighted in Lake Langano (c. 20 birds) and in Awash National Park (3–8 birds) in the East African Rift in Ethiopia. Its scientific name means the lost swallow and it has been suggested that it might breed in the hills surrounding the Red Sea in Sudan or Ethiopia.

The Lake Langano birds had blue-black upper parts with a rump varying from off-white to pale pink to rufous whilst the Awash swallows are described as having brownish throats and brownish-white underparts. The variations are not conclusive for attribution to the original specimen but cliff swallows are variable. It is alternatively placed in the genus Hirundo.

References
Citations

Sources
 BirdLife International (2007) Species factsheet: Hirundo perdita. Downloaded from http://www.birdlife.org on 14 August 2007

Red Sea cliff swallow
Fauna of the Red Sea
Endemic fauna of Sudan
Red Sea cliff swallow
Taxonomy articles created by Polbot

Species known from a single specimen